Parliamentary elections were held in Chad on Sunday, 13 February 2011, the first since 2002. The elections were originally scheduled for 28 November 2010, but were postponed following a meeting in September between the ruling party and opposition leaders. According to the National Independent Electoral Commission (CENI), this was due to timing constraints caused by complications encountered during electoral preparations.

The administration of President Idriss Déby has been in power since 1990, and his party, the Patriotic Salvation Movement (MPS), had won nearly three-quarters of seats in the 2002 elections, but the results were condemned by observers as flawed. Since 1990, the results of Chad's elections have been consistently disputed by opposition parties and civil organisations. This year's elections were the result of an accord signed by the ruling party and its opponents in August 2007, under the auspices of the European Union, to foster democracy in the war-torn country. However, international observers and opposition leaders stated prior to the elections that another victory for the MPS was most likely.

The elections saw the MPS-led coalition retain its majority in the National Assembly, winning 134 of the 188 seats. Presidential elections were subsequently held on 25 April 2011, which saw Déby re-elected.

Background 
On August 13, 2007, the ruling Patriotic Salvation Movement (MPS) of President Idriss Déby, its allies, and most opposition parties signed an agreement after six months of negotiations regarding the organisation of the election. According to the agreement, an electoral census will be organised, an improved electoral file will be created, and a new 31-member independent electoral commission, with equal representation for the ruling majority and the opposition and a president of the commission agreed upon by the parties, will be established. The agreement also provides for the use of single ballots, for the security forces to vote one day before the rest of the population, and for nomads to vote on the day of the election instead of beforehand as in the past. Additionally, the agreement provides for the inclusion of the opposition in the government. To allow time for the agreement to be implemented, the election will be delayed until 2009 and the mandate of the current National Assembly will be extended until then. Déby described the agreement as a step towards peace. The agreement was signed by 87 parties; the only major opposition group that did not sign was Federation, Action for the Republic (FAR).

FAR President Ngarlejy Yorongar criticised the agreement as inadequate and said that signing it would be a "waste of time." He said that there should instead be a dialogue involving the entire political scene, including rebels, the exiled opposition, and civil society, and that a credible election could not be conducted while a rebellion was taking place in part of the country. Yorongar was also critical of the fact that the independent electoral commission would be subject to the decisions of the Constitutional Council, which he alleged is controlled by Déby, and of the management of the electoral census by the government instead of the electoral commission.

A committee overseeing the implementation of the agreement was subsequently set up, headed by Lol Mahamat Choua, the President of the Rally for Democracy and Progress opposition party. During a battle between government forces and rebels in N'Djamena in February 2008, several opposition leaders, including Choua, were arrested, and doubt was subsequently cast over the future of the agreement by members of the opposition.

Following the arrests of the opposition leaders, the Coordination of Political Parties for the Defence of the Constitution (CPDC), a coalition whose leader, Ibni Oumar Mahamat Saleh, was among those arrested, suspended its participation on the follow-up committee.

Roughly 4.8 million citizens were registered to vote, just two-fifths of the population.

Campaign

Patriotic Salvation Movement 
President Déby, commenting on the elections, said, "Everyone has something to win. A greater presence of the opposition will only increase the credibility [of the government]".

Opposition 
The opposition is composed of more than one hundred tiny parties, which are mostly under-funded and highly fragmented. The main opposition group is the Coordination of Political Parties for the Defence of the Constitution (CPDC), an umbrella group of 20 parties, four of which hold seats in the current parliament.

During the lead-up to the elections, the CPDC accused the government of monopolising the state media, and criticised the "interference of officials at all levels in the electoral process on the one hand, and the overuse of means and assets of the state for electioneering".

Conduct
In N'Djamena, Déby called on all Chadians to fulfil their duty as a citizen, to choose their representatives in the national parliament.

The European Union and African Union have both sent electoral observers to the country. The EU mission reported that it had found no evidence of fraud. Louis Michel, head of the EU observer mission, said: "From our observations, we have not seen any irregularities specifically aimed at fraud". "In some polling stations there is a lack of material and organisation," he said. "However, it seems that these are fair, democratic and transparent elections." Michel also remarked on the relative stability in the country: "The mood is good and peaceful. There is no violence".

Results
Déby's Patriotic Salvation Movement won 110 of the 188 parliamentary seats, giving it a majority. Another 21 seats went to its allies, giving Déby's supporters an absolute majority, and indicating strong support for Déby ahead of the presidential election in April.

A total of sixteen parties won at least one seat. The most successful of the opposition groups was the National Union for Democracy and Renewal, led by Saleh Kebzabo, which won 11 seats.

References

Elections in Chad
Chad
Parliamentary election
February 2011 events in Africa
Election and referendum articles with incomplete results